The APRA Music Awards in Australia are annual awards to celebrate excellence in contemporary music, which honour the skills of member composers, songwriters, and publishers who have achieved outstanding success in sales and airplay performance.

Several award ceremonies are run in Australia by the Australasian Performing Right Association (APRA) and Australasian Mechanical Copyright Owners Society (AMCOS).  In addition to the APRA Music Awards, APRA AMCOS, in association with the Australian Music Centre, presents awards for classical music, jazz and improvised music, experimental music and sound art, known as the  Art Music Awards. It also runs, in association with the Australian Guild of Screen Composers (AGSC), the Screen Music Awards, to acknowledge excellence in the field of screen composition.

APRA Music Awards (Australia) 

The APRA Music Awards were established in 1982 to honour songwriters and music composers for their efforts. The award categories are:

Gold Awards 

From 1982 to 1990, the best songs were given the Gold Award, which was also called the Special Award. In the mid-1980s Platinum Awards were given to significant works from previous years.

Song of the Year 

Song of the Year is decided by the votes of APRA members. All eligible songs must be written by an APRA member and released in the preceding calendar year for consideration. The Song of the Year award is considered one of the most prestigious of the APRA Music Awards.

Songwriter of the Year 
Songwriter of the Year is voted by APRA's Board of Writer and Publisher Directors rewarding the songwriter who has recorded the most impressive body of work in the previous year.

The Ted Albert Award for Outstanding Services to Australian Music 

The Ted Albert Award for Outstanding Services to Australian Music' is decided by APRA's Board of Writer and Publisher Directors for a lifetime contribution. The Award is named after Ted Albert whose company Albert Productions put out records by The Easybeats, AC/DC and John Paul Young.

Breakthrough Songwriter Award 

Breakthrough Songwriter Award is decided by APRA's Board of Writer and Publisher Directors for an emerging songwriter or groups of writers. The award category was first introduced by APRA in 2002.

Awards for Most Performed Works 

There are a number of awards given for most performed work based on a statistical analysis of APRA's database. These awards include "Most Performed Australian Work of the Year", "Most Performed Australian Work Overseas", "Most Performed Foreign Work", "Most Performed Jazz Work", "Most Performed Country Work" and "Most Performed Dance Work".

Art Music Awards (with AMC) 

In 2001, APRA joined forces with the Australian Music Centre (AMC) to present awards for Australian classical music, known as Classical Music Awards. The AMC had been presenting annual awards for classical music since 1988, apart from a 1993–1995 hiatus due to funding cuts. The participation of APRA helped to secure the future of the awards, which are the only Australian awards for contemporary Australian classical music. This award has been won by well-known composers including Brenton Broadstock, Brett Dean, Ross Edwards, Georges Lentz, Liza Lim, Richard Mills, and Peter Sculthorpe. After another hiatus in 2010, the event returned as the Art Music Awards the following year, restructured and with two new categories.

The awards now cover classical, jazz and improvised music, experimental music and sound art, recognising achievement in composition, performance, education and presentation. , the current award structure recognises eleven annual awards and Luminary Awards for sustained contribution (nationally and for each state and territory) in Australian art music. There is also a discretionary award, The Richard Gill Award for Distinguished Services to Australian Music.

Richard Gill Award for Distinguished Services to Australian Music 

Originally named The Distinguished Services to Australian Music Award, from 2019 it was renamed in honour of Australian conductor and educator Richard Gill (19412018). It is determined by APRA's Board of Writer and Publisher Directors and the Australian Music Centre Board for a lifetime contribution to the art music community.

Screen Music Awards (with AGSC)

The annual Screen Music Awards were first presented in 2002 by APRA and AMCOS in conjunction with the Australian Guild of Screen Composers (AGSC). The ceremony, held in November, acknowledges excellence and innovation in the field of screen composition, and  covers 13 categories.

2002 Awards
International Achievement Award – David Hirschfelder
Best Feature Film Score – Alan John for The Bank
Best Soundtrack Album – Paul Kelly, Mairead Hannan, Kev Carmody, John Romeril, Deirdre Hannan and Alice Garner for One Night the Moon
2003 Awards
International Achievement Award – Bruce Smeaton
Best Feature Film Score – Nigel Westlake for The Nugget
Best Soundtrack Album – Cezary Skubiszewski for After the Deluge
2004 Awards
International Achievement Award – Lisa Gerrard
Best Feature Film Score – Elizabeth Drake for Japanese Story
Best Soundtrack Album – Iva Davies, Christopher Gordon and Richard Tognetti for Master and Commander: The Far Side of the World
2005 Awards
International Achievement Award – Bruce Rowland
Best Feature Film Score – Ben Ely, Matthew Fitzgerald, Tom Schutzinger and Peter Kelly (Decoder Ring) for Somersault
Best Soundtrack Album – Roger Mason for The Extra
2006 Awards
International Achievement Award – Peter Best
Best Feature Film Score – Francois Tetaz for Wolf Creek
Best Soundtrack Album – David Bridie, Albert David and Kadu for RAN: Remote Area Nurse
2007 Awards
International Achievement Award – The Wiggles
Best Feature Film Score – Nigel Westlake for Miss Potter
Best Soundtrack Album – Nigel Westlake for Miss Potter
2008 Awards
International Achievement Award – Garry McDonald and Laurie Stone
Best Feature Film Score – David Hirschfelder for Children of the Silk Road
Best Soundtrack Album – Michael Yezerski for The Black Balloon
Best Music for a Short Film - Geoffrey Russell for Noir Drive
2009 Awards
International Achievement Award – Guy Gross
Best Feature Film Score – Lisa Gerrard for Balibo
Best Soundtrack Album – Cezary Skubiszewski for Death Defying Acts
2010 Awards
Best Feature Film Score – Christopher Gordon for Mao's Last Dancer
Best Soundtrack Album – Christopher Gordon for Mao's Last Dancer
2011 Awards
Best Feature Film Score – Jed Kurzel for Snowtown
Best Soundtrack Album – Rafael May for Road Train
2012 Awards
Best Feature Film Score – Lisa Gerrard for Burning Man
Best Soundtrack Album – Michael Lira / Jono Ma / Antony Partos / Irine Vela for The Slap

Other awards

Emily Burrows Award
The Emily Burrows Award was instituted in 2001 in memory of Emily Burrows, a former APRA AMCOS membership representative and compliance officer. It is awarded to a South Australian artist or band annually with a $5,000 prize, to further their development and career. Electric Fields won it in 2016, with previous winners including Hilltop Hoods and The Beards, Dead Roo, and Ollie English

In 2019 the prize was awarded at the South Australian Music Awards (SAM Awards) for the first time, with Dead Roo winning the Award. Seabass were presented with the award at the SAM Awards in 2020, and Tilly Tjala Thomas won it in 2021. Thomas sings in both Nukunu language and English, with her single "Ngana Nyunyi" sung in both. She won the triple j unearthed's NIMAs competition, giving her the opportunity to play at the National Indigenous Music Awards in 2021.

Top 30 Australian Songs (2001 only)
As part of its 75th anniversary celebrations in 2001, APRA created a list of the top 30 Australian songs. A panel of 100 music personalities were asked to list the ten best Australian songs, the data was compiled and the Top Ten in numerical order, was announced at the 2001 APRA Music Awards ceremony. At the ceremony You Am I performed the #1 listed song "Friday on My Mind" with Ross Wilson performing the #2 listed song "Eagle Rock". The next 20 songs in the Top 30 had been announced four weeks earlier.

See also 
 APRA Awards (New Zealand) – annual awards in New Zealand, including the Silver Scroll Award for songwriting
 APRA Music Awards of 1982, and every year following

References

External links

 
Australian music awards